Maud is an unincorporated community located in Washington County, Kentucky, United States. Its post office is closed.

References

Unincorporated communities in Washington County, Kentucky
Unincorporated communities in Kentucky